Finntroll is a Finnish metal band from Helsinki that combines elements of black metal and folk metal. Finntroll's lyrics are mostly in Swedish, the only exception being the song "Madon Laulu" on Visor om slutet. Finntroll's original singer, Katla, decided to use Swedish over Finnish since he was part of a Swedish-speaking minority in Finland and the sound of the language seemed to better suit the band's "trollish" outfit. Despite several vocalist changes, this tradition has continued.

According to band members Vreth and Skrymer, they took their name from an old Finnish legend where Swedish priests coming to Finland had an encounter with a wild-looking man who killed most of their party. The survivors came back bearing the tale of the Finn-Troll.

Finntroll's lyrics mainly deal with legends and tales revolving around the fictional troll-king "Rivfader" and the trolls fighting against the Christians who entered their lands and spread their beliefs. A recurring theme is the story of two priests named "Aamund" and "Kettil": the first three full-length albums feature a rather short but fierce song about the two men who constantly get themselves into trouble with the trolls, only to get beaten up and mutilated over and over again by the wrathful followers of Rivfader.

To date, the band's discography includes seven full-length albums, a live album and three EPs. Their newest studio album Vredesvävd was released in 2020.

History  

Finntroll was founded in 1997 with a line-up which included guitarist Teemu "Somnium" Raimoranta and vocalist/lyricist Jan "Katla" Jämsen. A year later they were joined by guitarist Samuli "Skrymer" Ponsimaa, drummer Samu "Beast Dominator" Ruotsalainen, keyboardist Henri "Trollhorn" Sorvali and bassist Sami "Tundra" Uusitalo, creating the first stable line-up of the band. The band's first demo, Rivfader, released the same year.

Their second album, Jaktens Tid, was released in 2001. The following summer, the band had their first time playing festivals in Finland and other countries. The album features yoiking by then Shaman vocalist Jonne Järvelä, later known as vocalist and guitarist for fellow folk metal band Korpiklaani.

The year after the release of the album Jaktens Tid proved to be a misfortune for Finntroll: some tours had to be cancelled, and vocalist Jämsen had to retire from the band due to a viral-based tumor in his vocal cords which could not be removed surgically; he retired after the release of the EP Visor om slutet. The EP was recorded in early January 2003, in a forest cabin near Helsinki. It was an "acoustical experiment", where Jämsen and the new vocalist Tapio Wilska (of Sethian and Lyijykomppania) shared the singing duties among them. Visor om slutet was released as a mid-price EP and held rank on the Finnish midprice chart for several weeks.

On 16 March 2003, shortly before the release of Visor om slutet, guitarist Teemu Raimoranta died when he fell off a bridge in Hakaniemi, Helsinki. Although they had lost their last remaining founding members in this tragic event, the band did not dissolve, but after some time decided to go on, touring Europe for two weeks, supported by the band Katatonia. Guitarist Mikael Karlbom was hired as a replacement for Raimoranta.

In 2004, the band released an EP, Trollhammaren ("The Trollhammer"), a prequel to the soon to follow album Nattfödd ("Nightborn"). Also in 2004, Trollhorn stopped touring with the band, prompting touring musicians to be hired to fill the void left in his absence. Aleksi "Virta" Virta joined the band in an official capacity as second keyboardist in 2005.

On 29 January 2006, Tapio Wilska, vocalist of the band since 2003, was fired from the band. In a statement issued on the band's website, Wilska stated that he would like to keep the reason for his dismissal private.

Following Wilska's parting with the band, they decided to take on Mathias "Vreth" Lillmåns of Chthonian and Twilight Moon as a full-time member on vocals.

A new album, titled Ur jordens djup ("From the Depths of the Earth"), was released March 2007. This fourth album put more emphasis on epic keyboard riffs with very loud but melodic guitar. Former vocalist Katla was brought in to write the lyrics for this album, and continues in this capacity with the band. The last song contains an acoustic hidden track entitled Trollvisan which can be heard at 11:03 minutes. It is commonly believed to be the installment's "Aamund och Kettil song", yet there is no mention of the two priests in the lyrics, the song rather refers to "de kristna" ("the Christians") in general.

The band has recorded a live performance for its upcoming first live DVD. A release date is yet to be confirmed. They have released their fifth album, titled Nifelvind ("Underworld's Winds"), and Katla has again written the lyrics. The progress on the album was recorded by Trollhorn in a studio diary.  On 15 January 2010 Finntroll released a music video for the new song "Solsagan" on their MySpace page in preparation for the album release. The new album was then released in February 2010.

The band's sixth studio album Blodsvept was released on 25 March 2013.

On 13 May 2014, drummer Samu Ruotsalainen revealed that he would be departing the band in July of that year; the parting was confirmed to be amicable by the band. He was replaced by Heikki "Mörkö" Saari.

In June 2014, the band released a live album, Natten med de Levande Finntroll ("Night of the Living Finntroll"). Thomas Woroniak of RockRevolt Magazine stated "Natten Med De Levande Finntroll is a must-have for any dedicated Finntroll fan. Followers of the group have been waiting a long time for a live recording...the music is unique and vibrant in color and tonality, and the performance is exceptional."

On 25 June 2020, the band announced that their next album, titled Vredesvävd, would be released on 18 September.

Members

Current members
 Samuli "Skrymer" Ponsimaa – guitar (1998–present)
 Henri "Trollhorn" Sorvali – keyboards, guitars (1998–present; studio-only from 2004)
 Sami "Tundra" Uusitalo – bass (1998–present)
 Mikael "Routa" Karlbom – guitar (2003–present)
 Aleksi Virta - keyboards (2005–present)
 Mathias "Vreth" Lillmåns – vocals (2006–present)
 Heikki "Mörkö" Saari – drums (2014–present)

Current touring musicians
 Felipe Muñoz – keyboards (2016–present)

Former members
 Mikael "Ancient Lord" Harju – bass (1997–1998)
 Jan "Katla" Jämsen – vocals (1997–2003), keyboards (1997–1998), lyrics (1997–2003, 2006–present)
 Rauno "Nattvind" Raimoranta – drums, keyboards (1997–1998)
 Teemu "Somnium" Raimoranta – guitar (1997–2003; died 2003)
 Tomi "Grönt Helvetes Kungen" Ullgren – guitar (1997–1998)
 Samu "Beast Dominator" Ruotsalainen – drums (1998–2014)
 Tapio Wilska – vocals, lyrics (2003–2006)

Former touring musicians
 Meiju Enho – keyboards (2004–2005; toured in place of Trollhorn)
 Brandon Ellis (Arsis) - guitars 2013–2014; toured in place of Skrymer)

Timeline

Discography

Studio albums

EPs

Live albums

Music videos

References

External links 

Official MySpace page

Finnish heavy metal musical groups
Finnish folk metal musical groups
Musical groups established in 1997
Musical groups from Helsinki
Swedish-speaking population of Finland
Century Media Records artists
Spinefarm Records artists